Nicolò "Nico" Rode (1 January 1912 – 4 May 1998) was an Italian sailor. He competed at the 1948, 1952 and 1956 Olympics in the Star class with skipper Agostino Straulino on Merope. They won a gold medal in 1952 and a silver in 1956 and finished fifth in 1948.

Like Straulino, Rode was born in Mali Lošinj on the island of Lošinj, Croatia (at that time in the Austrian part of Austria-Hungary).

References

External links
 

1912 births
1998 deaths
Italian male sailors (sport)
Sailors at the 1948 Summer Olympics – Star
Sailors at the 1952 Summer Olympics – Star
Sailors at the 1956 Summer Olympics – Star
Olympic sailors of Italy
Olympic gold medalists for Italy
Olympic silver medalists for Italy
Olympic medalists in sailing
Star class world champions
Medalists at the 1956 Summer Olympics
Medalists at the 1952 Summer Olympics
World champions in sailing for Italy
Sailors of Marina Militare
People from Mali Lošinj